The Eighth Day of the Week is a 1958 Polish-German drama film directed by Aleksander Ford.

Cast 
 Sonja Ziemann - Agnieszka Walicka
 Zbigniew Cybulski - Piotr Terlecki
 Jan Świderski - Journalist
 Barbara Połomska - Ela
 Ilse Steppat - Walicka
 Emil Karewicz - Zawadzki
 Bum Krüger - Stefan Walicki
 Zbigniew Wójcik - Painter
 Leon Niemczyk - Ciapus
 Tadeusz Łomnicki - Grzegorz Walicki

References

External links 

Films directed by Aleksander Ford
1958 films
1958 drama films
Polish drama films
German drama films
1950s Polish-language films
1950s German films